Did I Shave My Legs for This? is the debut studio album by American country music artist Deana Carter, released via Patriot Records in the United Kingdom on February 27, 1995. Two singles were released from the album in the UK, "Angel Without a Prayer" and "Are You Coming Home Today?", which charted at numbers 100 and 93 respectively on the UK Singles Chart.

In 1996, Capitol Records had Carter record new material for the North American release of the album, which retained only three songs from the original release. This version features her breakthrough debut single "Strawberry Wine", a number-one hit on the Billboard Hot Country Singles & Tracks chart at the end of that year. "We Danced Anyway", "Count Me In", and the title track were also released as a singles. Of these, "We Danced Anyway" and the promotional single "How Do I Get There" also reached number one.

In honor of the 25th anniversary of the album, a remastered edition was released on November 5, 2021. The re-issue includes re-recordings of the title-track and "Strawberry Wine", featuring guest appearances from Lauren Alaina, Ashley McBryde, Vince Gill, Terri Clark, Sara Evans and Martina McBride.

Track listing

Chart performance
Did I Shave My Legs for This? is Carter's highest-charting album to date and her only album to chart in the top ten on the U.S. Billboard 200.

Weekly charts

Year-end charts

Certifications

Personnel
Adapted from Did I Shave My Legs for This? liner notes.
Musicians
 Deana Carter - vocals
 Joe Chemay - bass guitar (except tracks 1, 5, 6)
 Chris DiCroce - background vocals
 Dan Dugmore - acoustic guitar, steel guitar
 Chris Farren - acoustic guitar, background vocals
 Larry Franklin - fiddle, mandolin
 John Hobbs - keyboards, piano
 Dann Huff - electric guitar (tracks 1, 5, 6)
 Chuck Jones - acoustic guitar (tracks 1, 5, 6)
 Greg Morrow - drums (except tracks 1, 5, 6), percussion
 Steve Nathan - Hammond organ
 Brent Rowan - electric guitar
 Gary Park - acoustic guitar, electric guitar
 Pete Wasner - piano (tracks 1, 5, 6)
 Biff Watson - acoustic guitar
 Lonnie Wilson - drums (tracks 1, 5, 6)
 Glenn Worf - bass guitar (tracks 1, 5, 6)

Strings performed by the Nashville String Machine, arranged by David Campbell, and conducted by Carl Gorodetzky

Technical
 Jimmy Bowen - producer (tracks 1, 5, 6 only)
 Derek Bason - recording assistant, mixing assistant (tracks 1, 5, 6 only)
 Chris Farren - producer (all tracks)
 John Guess - producer (tracks 1, 5, 6 only)
 Tom Harding - additional recording
 Steve Marcantonio - recording, mixing (except tracks 1, 5, 6)
 Denny Purcell - mastering
 Tim Waters - recording assistant, mixing assistant
 Marty Williams - recording (tracks 1, 5, 6 only)

References

1995 debut albums
Capitol Records albums
Deana Carter albums
Albums produced by Chris Farren (country musician)